KØN - Gender Museum Denmark, formerly Kvindemuseet (Women's Museum), is a history museum in Aarhus, Denmark focused on the cultural history of gender and sexuality in Denmark. KØN was originally founded in 1982 as a women's history museum, and is housed in the former Aarhus City Hall, built in 1857. In 2016, the museum's thematic focus was expanded to encompass issues of gender and sexuality in the broadest sense, and as a result of that, the museum's name was changed to KØN (Gender in English) in 2021. 

As of 2012, the museum operated on a budget of DKK 10 million from state, municipal and private funding. There is a café and bakery at KØN.

Activities 
In addition to its permanent and temporary exhibitions, KØN provides educational outreach programs. In 2014, the Aarhus municipality approved an annual grant of DKK 500,000 to KØN to teach sex education, gender equality and democracy to schoolchildren.

References

Further reading

External links

Official Website (English version)

Listed buildings in Aarhus
Museums in the Central Denmark Region
Feminism in Denmark
Women's museums
Tourist attractions in Aarhus
Coffeehouses and cafés in Aarhus
Museums established in 1982
1982 establishments in Denmark
History of women in Denmark